Chore Chore Mastuto Bhai is a 2005 Indian Bengali-language comedy thriller film directed by Anup Sengupta, starring Mithun Chakraborty, Chiranjeet Chakraborty, Jisshu Sengupta, Koel Mallick and Deepankar De in the main roles.

Plot
Nagraj (Deepankar Dey) sends John to steal a rare Diamond worth crores from the museum. John betrays Nagraj and runs away with Diamond, but is killed by Ronnie, who leaves the Diamond with a taxi driver Yadav Das. Therefore, Yadav is jailed in John's murder case. His daughter Madhuri (Koel Mallick) disguises herself as a boy to run the taxi to support her family. Now Manik and Chand turn up at Madhuri's house and claim to be her long lost uncles from Africa. Madhuri is in love with Rahul, a Nagraj's henchman. As the Diamond is the prime attraction, everyone wants its possession. In the climax, Manik and Chand rescue Rahul, Madhuri and Madhabi from Nagraj and the police arrest Nagraj.

Cast
 Mithun Chakraborty as Manik
 Chiranjit Chakraborty as Chand
 Jisshu Sengupta as Rahul
 Koel Mallick as Madhuri
 Deepankar De as Nagraj, the main antagonist
 Subhashish Mukherjee
 Shankar Chakraborty as Nagraj's henchman
 Anamika Saha
 Joy Badlani
 Jeet in special appearance

Soundtrack 

The album is composed by Ashok Bhadra for Chore Chore Mastuto Bhai.

References

 http://www.induna.com/1000001721-productdetails/?oY6Sbg
 http://www.gomolo.in/Movie/Movie.aspx?mid=15383
 http://www.servinghistory.com/topics/Chore_Chore_Mastuto_Bhai

2005 films
Bengali-language Indian films
Bengali remakes of Hindi films
Films directed by Anup Sengupta
2000s Bengali-language films
Indian comedy thriller films